Buranjis (Ahom language: ancient writings) are a class of historical chronicles and manuscripts associated with the Ahom kingdom written initially in Ahom Language and later in Assamese language as well.  The Buranjis are an example of historical literature which is rare in India; though they bear resemblance to Southeast Asian traditions of historical literature. The Buranjis are generally found in manuscript form (locally called puthi), though many of these manuscripts have been compiled and published. They are some of the primary sources of historical information of Assam's medieval past, especially from the 13th century to the colonial times in 1828.

There were two types of Buranjis: the official Buranjis, which were compiled from the time of the first Ahom king Sukaphaa; and family Buranjis, which were compiled from the 16th century. The official Buranjis contained such information as description of important events as reported by reliable witnesses, correspondence from allied rulers, tax records, announcements, annual reports of various kinds, etc. Nevertheless, the Buranjis were continuously upgraded and often refreshed with the help of chronicles of allied peoples the Ahoms were in contact with, such as the Tai-Mau and Khamti.  The official Buranjis were kept in archives and most of them have been destroyed either by natural decay or by wars and conflicts. 

The details in the Buranjis regarding the Ahom-Mughal conflicts agree with those in the Mughal chronicles such as Baharistan, Padshahnama, Alamgirnamah and Fathiyyah; and they also provide additional details not found in these Mughal chronicles.

Description

Buranji writing tradition

There were two kinds of Buranjis: one maintained by the state (official) and the other maintained by families. Many such manuscripts were written by scribes under the office of the Likhakar Barua, which were based on state papers, such as diplomatic correspondences, spy reports, etc.<ref>"Information and facts mentioned in a buranji emerged after consulting state papers.... Official communications, letters of ambassadors or spy reports were significant parts of these state papers." </ref> The Buranjis and the state papers were usually secured in a store or library called Gandhia Bhoral under the supervision of an officer called Gandhia Barua. Others were written by nobles or by people under their supervision, often anonymously, though the authorship often becomes known. These documents reveal chronology of events, language, culture, society and the inner workings of the state machinery of the kingdom. They were written in "simple, lucid and unambiguous but expressive language with utmost brevity and least exaggeration." The tradition of writing Buranjis survived more than six hundred years well into the British period, till a few decades after the demise of the Ahom kingdom.

The Buranjis not only describe the Ahom kingdom, but also the neighbours (Jaintia, Kachari and Tripura Buranjis) and those with whom the Ahom kingdom had diplomatic and military contacts (Padshah Buranji). They were written on the barks of the Sanchi'' tree or aloe wood. Though many such Buranjis have been collected, compiled and published, an unknown number of Buranjis are still in private hands. During the reign of Rajeswar Singha, Kirti Chandra Borbarua had many Buranjis destroyed because he suspected they contained information on his lowly birth.

Language
Buranjis were written in the Ahom language, but since the 16th century they came to be increasingly written in the Assamese language—and Ahom Buranji manuscripts have become rare. The Ahom script used in the Buranjis is an older Shan writing system that was not fully developed to include diacritics to denote the different tones or distinguish between proto-Tai voiceless and voiced distinctions.   The language of the Assamese Buranjis, on the other hand, formed the template for the standard literary language in the late-19th century. Assamese Buranjis used the Garhgaya style of writing—one of three different styles of the Bengali-Assamese script prevalent between the 17th and 19th centuries in Assam.

Edited and Published Buranjis

Notes

References

 
 
 
 
 
 
 
 

Indian literature
Ahom kingdom
Diplomatic correspondence
Tai history
Indian chronicles